Colorful You is Miguel Migs's (real name Miguel Steward) debut album, after working extensively on previous album projects for the Naked Music/Astralwerks label.

Track listing

Personnel 
Dave Boonshoft – executive producer
Emily Lazar – mastering
Miguel Migs – arranger, producer
Stuart Patterson – art direction
Bruno Ybarra – executive producer

References

Astralwerks albums
2002 debut albums
Miguel Migs albums
Downtempo albums